Kongeparken (The King's Park) is an amusement park in the village of Ålgård, near Stavanger in Norway. Kongeparken is the biggest amusement park in the south-west of Norway, and the main tourist destination in the county of Rogaland. The park has more than 50 different rides and attractions. and has won multiple awards.

History
Kongeparken was opened by Gabriel Ålgård in May 1986 and intended to be a park with outdoor activities such as BMX, roller-skating and golf. Construction cost about 220 million Norwegian kroner. Kongeparken had more than 200,000 visitors in its opening year but was bankrupt by July. In 1997, the park was bought by its current owners, the Lund family, who had more than a hundred years experience through the Lunds Tivoli amusement parks. The Lund family added new themes and increased activities, reversing a decline in visitor numbers. Kongeparken is owned and operated by Rogaland Fritidspark AS. Haakon Lund, the son of Bjoern and Veslemoey Lund, is currently in charge.

Bears theme

The Lund family rebuilt Kongeparken around the theme of bears. In the late 1800s, the family had been the first importers in Europe of teddy bears from America.  In 1997, a pair of bears, Brumle and Brumleline, were brought to the park. Named the King and Queen of Bears, they are housed in a castle which features one of the park's biggest rides, a roller coaster with spinning gondolas. Other bears in the park are named the Bie Queen, Pysjamas, Tranbamsen, Storm, and the Icebear. The park also has a day spa, the BearBotel, where children can leave their teddy bears.

Rides and adventures 
Kongeparken is targeted at children aged from three to 12 years old but also has more challenging activities for older children. The park has more than 50 rides, along with restaurants and other attractions. New rides are introduced each year, such as the Fossen water ride in 2013.
Other attractions include a bobsleigh track, a do-it-yourself chocolate factory, and a children's fire station.

Christmas in Kongeparken
Jul i Kongeparken (Christmas in Kongeparken) is held in November and December and features fairy lights, Christmas trees, elves, carol singing and family workshops.

Attractions and rides

Source: Kongparken, Errors might occur.

Awards
Kongeparken has won many awards in Norway and internationally.
 In 2012: The Children's Fire Station (Barnas Brannstasjon) won the THEA Awards for best new attraction!.
 In 2012: Kongeparken got top score (6/6) by the Norwegian newspaper VG. 
 In 2011: Kongeparken got top score (6/6) by the Norwegian newspaper Dagbladet. 
 In 2010: Kongeparken was the biggest attraction in Rogalands, Norway, with 215 303 visitors.
 In 2009 and 2010: Kongeparken got a score of 5/6 by the Norwegian newspaper Dagbladet.
 In 2008: Kongeparken was named one of the two best amusement parks in Norway by the national newspaper Dagbladet.
 In 2006: Spirit Award for the best leadership training program. The prize is awarded in the U.S. 
 In 2005: Rogaland Travel Award.
 In 2004: Brass Ring Award for best print advertising in a park with 250 000 visitors. The prize is awarded in the U.S.
 Pony Award. The prize is awarded in Italy.

Visitors 
1986: 215,000 visitors

1997: 40,000 visitors

2009: 199,451 visitors

2010: 215,203 visitors

2011: 203,673 visitors

2012: 213,365 visitors

2013: 230,434 visitors

2014: 254,629 visitors

2015: 259,113 visitors

2016: 251,340 visitors

2017: 246,313 visitors

2018: 248,467 visitors

References

External links
Official website (English language)
Archived version

Amusement parks in Norway
Gjesdal
1986 establishments in Norway
Amusement parks opened in 1986